Modern Heart is the fifth studio album by Belgian recording artist Milow, released by Homerun Records and Island Records on May 13, 2016.

Track listing

Charts

Weekly charts

Year-end charts

Release history

References

External links
 

2016 albums
Milow albums
Albums produced by Joe Chiccarelli